Impending Doom is an American Christian deathcore band from Riverside, California. The group has released six full-length studio albums and are currently a five piece with lead vocalist Brook Reeves as one of the two original remaining members along with Manny Contreras who left the band in 2010 but returned in 2012. The band refers to their style of music as "gorship" - a portmanteau of the words gore and worship.

History 
Guitarist Manny Contreras and vocalist Brook Reeves started Impending Doom together on October 31, 2005. The band practiced with their sound before writing enough songs to record their demo, The Sin and Doom of Godless Men. After this release, Greg Pewthers joined as a third guitarist after also leaving Oblige. Later that year, bassist Jon Alfaro left the band and David Sittig was added to the line-up in his replacement. Chris Forno also left and was never replaced. Andy Hegg later took the place of Bueno and the band recorded the album Nailed. Dead. Risen. after getting signed to Facedown Records. Due to drummer Andy Hegg's dedication to his soccer scholarship, Impending Doom was forced to employ substitute drummers for the tours that supported the album. Since then touring drummer Chad Blackwell became the official drummer for the band, during which Greg Pewthers returned to Oblige (a band later known as The Devastated), and was replaced by Cory Johnson, formerly of Sleeping Giant.

The group signed to Facedown Records in January 2007, and their debut release for the label, Nailed. Dead. Risen., reached number 46 on the Billboard Top Heatseekers chart. The record has received generally positive reviews. The band has since started a street team to promote their music, which can be found on their Myspace top 8. The group then embarked on a tour of the United States to support the album in autumn 2007, including dates with Dead to Fall, Winds of Plague and With Dead Hands Rising. In 2009 the band released their second album, The Serpent Servant. Sometime after the release, drummer Chad Blackwell, a native of Pensacola, Florida, left the band to attend the Atlanta Institute of Music, to which Impending Doom asked former member Isaac Bueno to rejoin.

Impending Doom released their second album, The Serpent Servant, on March 31, 2009 which has hit number 3 on the Billboard Top Heatseekers chart. Their third album, There Will Be Violence, was released on July 20, 2010. Sometime during the recording of the new album, both Manny Contreras and Isaac Bueno left the band for unknown reasons. Since then the band brought Brandon Trahan (formerly of Mirror of Dead Faces, xDeathstarx) into the line-up but have yet to find another permanent guitarist. The band has been on the Thrash and Burn tour 2010 with Through the Eyes of the Dead, Kittie, Born of Osiris, Asking Alexandria and more. They have toured with MyChildren MyBride, The Crimson Armada, Chimaira, and other bands.

The band also created their own symbol called the "Repentagram" combining the words repent and pentagram. The band explained the Repentagram with the following:
We've gotten a lot of mail questioning the Repentagram Logo, I would like to take time right now to explain it to you all. First off we are a Christian band and a real one at that, we would never put something out that had satanic meaning or anything negative. We thought up the word "REPENTAGRAM" basically putting two words together. 1. REPENT (meaning: to feel such sorrow for sin or fault as to be disposed to change one's life for the better; be penitent.) 2. PENTAGRAM (which in the dark metal world is a satanic symbol.) Since we are a Christian death metal band we wanted to think up something clever; thus the Repentagram came into thought. It is not the same amount of sides as a pentagram, we are going for making a Christian death metal symbol. Just like we created the word "GORSHIP" (which as you all should know, does NOT mean worship gore, it means worshiping God through our Gore sounding music) the Repentagram is just the new word. Please pass this information along to anyone you may know that thinks anything more than it really is.

Baptized in Filth was produced by Andreas Magnusson who produced Oh, Sleeper's album Children of Fire and was mixed by Machine. The album is focused in God, Satan and Number of the beast. The first single is "For the Wicked" and the first video is "Murderer". A few months after the release of Baptized in Filth, Cory Johnson was fired from the band and was replaced by former founding member Manny Contreras, who had become a member of Oblige (later known as The Devastated) during his time off from Impending Doom. Johnson soon after being fired join fellow Christian metal band, MyChildren MyBride.

Lead vocalist, Brook Reeves, was one of the many vocalists that performed at the Mitch Lucker Memorial Show on December 21, 2012 with Suicide Silence in honor of their deceased vocalist, Mitch Lucker, who died on November 1, 2012. Reeves performed the song "Ending Is the Beginning", off the 2005 Suicide Silence. On February 26, 2013, Brook Reeves was also featured on the single track "Efforts to Outcomes" by Demise.

In January 2013 Eric Correa joined the band as their second guitarist. Correa was Impending Doom's acting guitar tech for 2012's tour cycle. The band entered the studio in New Jersey with Producer Will Putney in May 2013 to record their fifth studio album. Impending Doom will be headlining this summer's Scream the Prayer Tour.

The band confirmed that their album Death Will Reign would be released through eOne Music on November 5, 2013.

In 2016, the first Impending Doom show in three years, took place at the Facedown Fest 2016 on May 14, 2016, in Pomona, California. The band performed at Facedown Fest 2017.

Their song, "Murderer", was included on the Killing Floor 2 soundtrack.

On April 2, 2018, the band released a lyric video for their new single, "The Wretched and Godless", as well as a release date and preorders for their new album, The Sin and Doom Vol. II. The album was released on June 22, 2018. On February 24, 2019, Brandon "B-Town" Trahan announced his departure from the band and that his good friend Andrew Holzbaur would be taking over.

An EP, Hellbent, with Will Putney mixing, mastering and producing, was initially announced to be released on January 14, 2022, but was instead released early on digital platforms on October 29, 2021 as a surprise release. On July 19, 2022, the band posted on social media that they are working on a follow-up to Hellbent, with Brook Reeves stating they hope to release it "Sooner rather than later."

Music style and influences 

Impending Doom performs deathcore, which is a fusion between death metal and metalcore. They are influenced by death metal, grindcore, hardcore punk and nu metal. The band refers to their style of music as "Gorship", which is described by Reeves as "Worshiping God through our gore-sounding music".

The band has stated that they are influenced from groups such as Deftones, Korn, Slipknot, Lamb of God, Nile, Aborted, Guttural Secrete, Origin, Despised Icon and Ion Dissonance.  In various interviews, the band members have stated they draw influences from bands such as Meshuggah, Nine Inch Nails, Radiohead, Napalm Death, Suffocation, Metallica, Cannibal Corpse, The Acacia Strain, As I Lay Dying, Killswitch Engage, Morbid Angel, and many other bands.

In an interview Metalriot.com, Brook Reeves has said he is influenced by Underoath, Living Sacrifice, Advent, Sinai Beach, Aborted, Cattle Decapitation, Septicflesh, and many other underground death metal bands.

Band members 
Current
 Brook Reeves – vocals (2005–present)
 David Sittig – bass (2006–present)
 Manny Contreras – lead guitar (2005–2010, 2012–present); rhythm guitar (2021–present); bass (2005)
 Andrew Holzbaur – drums (2019–present)

Former
 Jon Alfaro – bass (2005–2006)
 Chris Forno – rhythm guitar (2005–2007); lead guitar (2006–2007); bass (2005)
 Greg Pewthers – rhythm guitar (2006–2008)
 Andy Hegg – drums (2007–2008)
 Chad Blackwell – drums (2008–2009)
 Isaac Bueno – drums (2005–2007, 2009)
 Cory Johnson – rhythm guitar (2008–2012); lead guitar (2010–2012)
 Brandon "B-Town" Trahan – drums (2009–2019)
 Eric Correa – rhythm guitar (2012–2021)

Touring
 Jake Foust – rhythm guitar (2010)
 Phil Dubois-Coyne – drums (2011)
 Tobey Lundberg – rhythm guitar (2022–present)

Timeline

Discography

Studio albums

EPs
 The Sin and Doom of Godless Men (Demo) (2005)
 Hellbent (2021)

Singles
 "The Wretched and Godless" (2018)
 "Satanic Panic" (2021)

Music videos

References

External links 

 

Christian extreme metal groups
American deathcore musical groups
Death metal musical groups from California
Musical groups established in 2005
Musical quartets
MNRK Music Group artists
American Christian metal musical groups
Musical groups from Riverside County, California
2005 establishments in California